"Fate" is a song by Chaka Khan from her 1981 album What Cha' Gonna Do for Me. Despite not being released as a single, "Fate" is often included on disco, post-disco and other compilations such as The Very Best of 100 R&B Classics & 100 Hits Disco. It was also remixed on Chaka Khan's remix album Life Is a Dance: The Remix Project under the title "Fate (David Shaw & Winston Jones Remix)", this version of the song was 5:38, over 2 minutes longer than the original.

Samples
The instrumental intro to "Fate" has been sampled on many occasions, notably by Stardust in 1998 for their song "Music Sounds Better with You", which reached no. 2 on the UK and no. 1 on the US Billboard Hot Dance Club Play chart.
"Fate" was also sampled in 2015 by Statik Selektah for his song "Beautiful Life", featuring Action Bronson and Joey Bada$$.

References

External links
 Chaka Khan - Fate (1981) on YouTube

1981 songs
Chaka Khan songs
Post-disco songs
Songs written by Frank Musker
Song recordings produced by Arif Mardin
Songs written by Dominic Bugatti